The carry-less product of two binary numbers
is the result of carry-less multiplication of these numbers.
This operation conceptually works like long multiplication
except for the fact that the carry
is discarded instead of applied to the more significant position.
It can be used to model operations over finite fields,
in particular multiplication of polynomials from GF(2)[X],
the polynomial ring over GF(2).

The operation is also known as an XOR multiplication, as carry-discarding addition is equivalent to an exclusive or.

Definition 

with  denoting the bits of these numbers.
Then the carry-less product of these two numbers is defined to be
, with each bit  computed
as the exclusive or of products of bits from the input numbers as follows:

Example 

Consider a = 101000102 and b = 100101102,
with all numbers given in binary.
Then the carry-less multiplication of these is essentially what one would get
from performing a long multiplication but ignoring the carries.

                   1 0 1 0 0 0 1 0 = a
    ---------------|---|-------|--
    1 0 0 1 0 1 1 0|0 0 0 0 0 0 0
        1 0 0 1 0 1 1 0|0 0 0 0 0
                1 0 0 1 0 1 1 0|0
    ------------------------------
    1 0 1 1 0 0 0 1 1 1 0 1 1 0 0
              ^ ^

So the carry-less product of a and b would be c = 1011000111011002.
For every bit set in the number a, the number b is shifted to the left
as many bits as indicated by the position of the bit in a.
All these shifted versions are then combined using an exclusive or,
instead of the regular addition which would be used for regular long multiplication.
This can be seen in the columns indicated by ^, where regular addition
would cause a carry to the column to the left, which does not happen here.

Multiplication of polynomials 

The carry-less product can also be seen as a multiplication of polynomials
over the field GF(2).
This is because the exclusive or corresponds to the addition in this field.

In the example above, the numbers a and b corresponds to polynomials

 

and the product of these is

 

which is what the number c computed above encodes.
Notice how  and
 thanks to the
arithmetic in GF(2).
This corresponds to the columns marked ^ in the example.

Applications 

The elements of GF(2n), i.e. a finite field whose order is a power of two,
are usually represented as polynomials in GF(2)[X].
Multiplication of two such field elements
consists of multiplication of the corresponding polynomials,
followed by a reduction with respect to some irreducible polynomial
which is taken from the construction of the field.
If the polynomials are encoded as binary numbers,
carry-less multiplication can be used to perform the first step of this computation.

Such fields have applications in cryptography and for some checksum algorithms.

Implementations 

Recent x86 processors support the CLMUL instruction set and thus
provide a hardware instruction to perform this operation.

For other targets it is possible to implement the computation above as a software algorithm,
and many cryptography libraries will contain an implementation
as part of their finite field arithmetic operations.

Other bases 

The definition of a carry-less product as the result of a long multiplication discarding carry
would readily apply to bases other than 2.
But the result depends on the basis, which is therefore an essential part of the operation.
As this operation is typically being used on computers operating in binary,
the binary form discussed above is the one employed in practice.

Polynomials over other finite fields of prime order do have applications,
but treating the coefficients of such a polynomial as the digits of a single number is rather uncommon,
so the multiplication of such polynomials would not be seen as a carry-less multiplication of numbers.

See also 

 CLMUL instruction set, an x86 ISA extension
 Finite field arithmetic
 Galois/Counter Mode

References 

Binary arithmetic
Computer arithmetic
Multiplication